Kello may refer to:

People
 Esther Kello (1571–1624), Scottish miniaturist, calligrapher, writer, and embroider
 Jagama Kello (1922—2017), Ethiopian military officer
 Marián Kello (born 1982), Slovak former footballer

Other uses
 Kello Hospital, a health facility in Biggar, Scotland, United Kingdom
 Kello Rovers F.C., a Scottish football club